Verdalen is a village in Klepp municipality in Rogaland county, Norway.  The village is located immediately northwest of the municipal centre of Kleppe, south of the village of Voll, and east of the village of Bore.  The residential village of Verdalen has grown together with Kleppe since around 2000, forming one large  urban area with a population of 9,245 people in 2019.

References

Villages in Rogaland
Klepp